The Crossing of Ingo is a children's fantasy novel by Helen Dunmore, first published in 2008. It is the fourth and final volume in the Ingo tetralogy.

It was longlisted for the 2008 Booktrust Teenage Prize.

Plot summary
Sapphire and Conor have been called to make the dangerous Crossing of Ingo, a journey to the bottom of the world, and it has been prophesied that if they complete it then Ingo and Air will start to heal. They have their Mer friends, Faro and Elvira, to help them, but their old enemy, Ervys, is determined to make sure they don't succeed. They have many adventures going around the world and Sapphire finds new abilities.

Reception
The book has received positive reception from the Liverpool Echo and The Times, the latter of which described it as "a dramatic climax" to the series and picked it for a summer reading selection for 2008.

References

External links

Author's Official Website

2008 British novels
2008 fantasy novels
Children's fantasy novels
Novels by Helen Dunmore
HarperCollins books
British children's novels
2008 children's books
Mermaid novels